The 1929 Boston Red Sox season was the 29th season in the franchise's Major League Baseball history. The Red Sox finished last in the eight-team American League (AL) with a record of 58 wins and 96 losses, 48 games behind the Philadelphia Athletics, who went on to win the 1929 World Series.

Prior to the season, both the Red Sox and the Boston Braves received permission from the City of Boston to play home games on Sundays. While the Red Sox normally played their home games at Fenway Park, Sunday home games were played at Braves Field, as Fenway was close to a house of worship. The first organized baseball game played in Boston on a Sunday was a preseason exhibition on April 14, 1929, with the Braves beating the Red Sox at Braves Field, 4–0. The first major league regular season game played in Boston on a Sunday was on April 28, 1929, with the Philadelphia Athletics defeating the Red Sox at Braves Field, 7–3. The Red Sox played a total of 17 home games at Braves Field during the 1929 season; 15 games on Sundays, and a doubleheader on September 2, Labor Day Monday. The first game of that doubleheader is notable for Joe Cronin hitting for the cycle.

Regular season

Season standings

Record vs. opponents

Opening Day lineup

Roster

Player stats

Batting

Starters by position 
Note: Pos = Position; G = Games played; AB = At bats; H = Hits; Avg. = Batting average; HR = Home runs; RBI = Runs batted in

Other batters 
Note: G = Games played; AB = At bats; H = Hits; Avg. = Batting average; HR = Home runs; RBI = Runs batted in

Pitching

Starting pitchers 
Note: G = Games pitched; IP = Innings pitched; W = Wins; L = Losses; ERA = Earned run average; SO = Strikeouts

Other pitchers 
Note: G = Games pitched; IP = Innings pitched; W = Wins; L = Losses; ERA = Earned run average; SO = Strikeouts

Relief pitchers 
Note: G = Games pitched; W = Wins; L = Losses; SV = Saves; ERA = Earned run average; SO = Strikeouts

References

External links 
1929 Boston Red Sox team page at Baseball Reference
1929 Boston Red Sox season at baseball-almanac.com

Boston Red Sox seasons
Boston Red Sox
Boston Red Sox
1920s in Boston